Mario Scapini (born 2 February 1989) is a former Italian male middle-distance runner, who at the age of 23, after winning three Italian championships and taking part in a World championship and a European championship, was forced to permanently stop his career as a sportsman due to stomach cancer.

Biography
During his youth career he won the gold medal at the European Athletics U20 Championships in 2007.

Achievements

National titles
 Italian Athletics Championships
 800 metres: 2009
 1500 metres: 2009
 Italian Athletics Indoor Championships
 1500 metres: 2010

References

External links
 

1989 births
Living people
Italian male middle-distance runners
Athletes from Milan